Agustín is a Spanish given name and sometimes a surname. It is related to Augustín.

People with the name include:

Given name 
 Agustín (footballer), Spanish footballer
 Agustín Calleri (born 1976), Argentine tennis player
 Agustín Cárdenas (1927–2001), Afro-Cuban sculptor
 Agustín de Iturbide (1783–1824), First Emperor of Mexico
 Agustín de Rojas Villandrando (1572–1618), Spanish writer and actor
 Agustín Fiorilli (born 1978), Argentine swimmer
 Agustín Jerónimo de Iturbide y Huarte (1807–1866), Prince Imperial of Mexico
 Agustín Pedro Justo (1876–1943), former President of Argentina.
 Agustín Lara, renowned Mexican musician
 Agustín Moreno (born 1967), former tennis player
 Agustín Muñoz Grandes (1896–1970), Spanish general and politician
 Agustín Olvera (died 1876), pioneer of Los Angeles, California
 Agustín Pichot (born 1974), Argentine Rugby union player
 Agustin Presinger (1869–1934) German bishop and missionary
 Agustín Barrios Mangoré (died 1944), eminent Paraguayan guitarist and composer
 Agustín Ramírez (born 1952), Mexican singer-songwriter of Los Caminantes
 Agustín Ramos Calero (1919–1989), United States Army soldier
 Agustín Ross (1844–1925), Chilean politician and creator of the Agustín Ross Park, Agustín Ross Hotel, Agustín Ross Balcony, Agustín Ross Cultural Center
 Agustín Vásquez Mendoza, 445th FBI Ten Most Wanted Fugitive
 Agustí Villaronga (born 1953), Spanish filmmaker
 Agustin Xaho (1811–1858), one of the most important Romantic Basque writers
 Louie Jon Agustin Sanchez, poet, fictionist, critic, and journalist

Surname 
 Ato Agustin (born 1963), Filipino basketball player
 José Agustín (born 1944), Mexican novelist
 Joselito Agustin (1976–2010), also known as Aksyon Lito, Filipino journalist
 Laura María Agustín, human trafficking and informal labor markets researcher
 Manuel Agustín (1912–1997), Spanish field hockey player
 Marvin Agustin (born 1979), Filipino actor and entrepreneur
 Pedro Agustín (1512–1572), Spanish Catholic bishop
 Ucu Agustin (born 1976), Indonesian journalist, writer, and documentary filmmaker
 Antonio Agustín y Albanell (1516–1586), also known as Augustinus, Spanish Humanist historian, jurist and Roman Catholic archbishop of Tarragona
 Francisco Agustín y Grande (1753–1800), Spanish painter

See also 
 Estadio Agustín Sánchez, La Chorrera, Panama
 Estadio Agustín Tovar, Barinas, Barinas, Venezuela
 Estadio Víctor Agustín Ugarte, Potosí, Bolivia
 Juan Agustín Maza University, Mendoza, Argentina
 Liceo Agustín Ross Edwards, high school in Pichilemu, Chile
 San Agustín
 Geographic Institute Agustín Codazzi, cartography authority of the government of Colombia
 Augustin (name), given name and surname

References 

Spanish masculine given names

es:Agustín